Catron County is a county in the U.S. state of New Mexico. As of the 2010 census, the population was 3,725, making it New Mexico's third-least populous county. Its county seat is Reserve. Catron County is New Mexico's largest county by area.

History
Human settlement in the Catron County region dates to some of the earliest in the Americas. During the Clovis period, between 10999 BC and 8000 BC, and Folsom period, between 7999 BC and 5999 BC, the Ake Site was occupied near Datil. Bat Cave, near Horse Springs, was occupied around 3,500 BC.

The Mimbres culture was expressed by the Mogollon people. They lived throughout the Catron County area from AD 1000 to 1130. Their art is renowned for its beauty.

In the 16th century, Spanish explorers and colonists came to the region, declaring it in 1598 to be part of Santa Fé de Nuevo México, a province of New Spain in the Americas. The province remained in Spanish control until Mexico gained independence in 1821. Under the 1824 Constitution of Mexico, this became the federally administered Territory of New Mexico.

Mexico ceded the region to the U.S. in the Treaty of Guadalupe Hidalgo in 1848 after being defeated in the Mexican–American War. In 1849, President Zachary Taylor proposed that New Mexico, including this region, immediately be admitted as a state in order to sidestep political conflict over the expansion of slavery in the territories. That did not happen. European-American settlers from the southern and eastern states began to arrive here, including some with enslaved African Americans. The territory did not become a state until 1912, long after the Civil War and abolition of slavery.

In 1880, Sergeant James C. Cooney was the first person to find silver and gold ore in the mountains of Catron County. He was reportedly killed by Chiricahua Apache led by Victorio that year, in what the European Americans called the "Alma Massacre". His remains are buried at Cooney's Tomb.

The foothills and canyons provided many hiding places for Apache warriors as they continued to resist American encroachment. During this time Cochise was another well-known Chiricahua leader. Noted war chief Goyaałé (Geronimo) had several hideouts in the county. Later in 1880, Buffalo Soldiers led by Sergeant George Jordan defeated Chiricahua Apache warriors led by Victorio in the Battle of Fort Tularosa. Four years later, self-appointed sheriff Elfego Baca was the hero of the so-called Frisco shootout in San Francisco Plaza.

The country also attracted European-American outlaws. In the mid-1880s Butch Cassidy and his Wild Bunch gang holed up at a ranch near Alma. Notorious outlaw Tom Ketchum also lived in Catron County around this time.

Socorro County included all of Catron County's territory from the creation of Santa Fé de Nuevo México until 1921. At that time, Catron County was organized and named for Thomas B. Catron, a leading figure in New Mexico statehood and its first US senator. In 1927, the State Legislature attempted to abolish both Socorro and Catron in order to create a new Rio Grande County. A court suit voided this act, and the two counties retained their independence.

The Lightning Field, an art installation on the open earth, brought national attention to Quemado in this county in the late 1970s.

Geography

Catron County is the largest county, by area, in New Mexico. At almost , Catron County is larger than four states. With a population of only 3,400 people, the county is as sparsely populated as many an old West frontier area. The elk population at some 12,000 head, is much larger than the sparse human population.

Within the boundaries of Catron County lie parts of the Gila National Forest, the Apache National Forest and the Cibola National Forest. The establishment of these national forests, in the past called "forest reserves," led to the name Reserve being given to a village on the San Francisco River, which also serves as the County Seat. There are no stop lights in the whole county, so when license tests are given in Reserve, an artificial portable stop light is set up in a parking lot.

Bordering Arizona, Catron County affords the shortest route between Albuquerque and Phoenix or Tucson.

In Catron County there is a volcanic area that until recently contained sufficient heat to cause steam to rise after a slight rain. It is called Burning Mountain and appears to have been used by the Apache for healing purposes. The county is home to the Red Hill Volcanic Field as well as the Plains of San Agustin.

Mountains

 Black Mountain
 Black Range
 Datil Mountains
 Diablo Range
 Gallo Mountains
 Mangas Mountains
 Mogollon Mountains
 Saliz Mountains
 San Francisco Mountains
 Tularosa Mountains
 Whitewater Baldy

Bodies of water

 San Francisco River
 Tularosa River
 Rio Salado
 Middle Fork Hot Springs
 Jordan Hot Springs (New Mexico)
 Turkey Creek Hot Springs
 Zuni Salt Lake

Forests
 Apache-Sitgreaves National Forest
 Blue Range Wilderness
 Cibola National Forest
 Gila Wilderness
 Gila National Forest
 Whitewater Canyon National Forest Recreation Area

Adjacent counties
 Cibola County - north
 Socorro County - east
 Sierra County - southeast
 Grant County - south
 Greenlee County, Arizona - west
 Apache County, Arizona - west

National protected areas
 Apache National Forest (part)
 Cibola National Forest (part)
 Gila Cliff Dwellings National Monument
 Gila National Forest (part)

Demographics

2000 census
As of the 2000 census of 2000, there were 3,543 people, 1,584 households, and 1,040 families living in the county. The population density was 0.51 people per square mile (0.20/km2). There were 2,548 housing units at an average density of 0.37 per square mile (0.14/km2). The racial makeup of the county was 87.75% White, 0.28% Black or African American, 2.20% Native American, 0.68% Asian, 0.06% Pacific Islander, 5.42% from other races, and 3.61% from two or more races. 19.16% of the population were Hispanic or Latino of any race.

There were 1,584 households, out of which 22.30% had children under the age of 18 living with them, 55.40% were married couples living together, 7.60% had a female householder with no husband present, and 34.30% were non-families. 30.10% of all households were made up of individuals, and 11.40% had someone living alone who was 65 years of age or older. The average household size was 2.23 and the average family size was 2.75.

In the county, the population was spread out, with 21.10% under the age of 18, 4.20% from 18 to 24, 19.50% from 25 to 44, 36.40% from 45 to 64, and 18.80% who were 65 years of age or older. The median age was 48 years. For every 100 females there were 104.70 males. For every 100 females age 18 and over, there were 101.70 males.

The median income for a household in the county was $23,892, and the median income for a family was $30,742. Males had a median income of $26,064 versus $18,315 for females. The per capita income for the county was $13,951. About 17.40% of families and 24.50% of the population were below the poverty line, including 39.60% of those under age 18 and 14.90% of those age 65 or over.

2010 census
As of the 2010 census, there were 3,725 people, 1,787 households, and 1,080 families living in the county. The racial makeup of the county was 89.8% white, 2.7% American Indian, 0.4% black or African American, 0.2% Asian, 3.8% from other races, and 3.1% from two or more races. Those of Hispanic or Latino origin made up 19.0% of the population.

The largest ancestry groups were:

 29.1% American
 18.8% English
 17.5% German
 10.4% Mexican
 9.8% Irish
 5.1% Spanish
 3.3% Scottish
 2.3% Scotch-Irish
 2.1% Navajo
 1.8% Swedish
 1.8% Welsh
 1.7% Danish
 1.2% Dutch
 1.1% Italian
 1.1% Norwegian

Of the 1,787 households, 16.4% had children under the age of 18 living with them, 52.2% were married couples living together, 4.8% had a female householder with no husband present, 39.6% were non-families, and 34.8% of all households were made up of individuals. The average household size was 2.03 and the average family size was 2.57. The median age was 55.8 years.

The median income for a household in the county was $31,914 and the median income for a family was $40,906. Males had a median income of $46,304 versus $23,325 for females. The per capita income for the county was $20,895. About 10.1% of families and 15.3% of the population were below the poverty line, including 31.5% of those under age 18 and 12.0% of those age 65 or over.

Points of interest
 Ake Site - A prehistoric archaeological location near the town of Datil in the San Augustine Basin, it has been dated during the Clovis period between 10999 BC 8000 BC, and during the Folsom period between 7999BC and 5999 BC, making it among the oldest inhabited sites in the American Southwest.
 Bat Cave - Formed by ancient wave, the cave was covered by an inland sea 35 miles long and 165 feet deep 15,000 years ago. In the late 1940s and early 50s, archeologists found stone artifacts of human inhabitation spanning 5,000 years.
 Bearwallow Park
 Bearwallow Mountain Lookout Cabins and Shed - Built in 1940 by the Works Progress Administration, they are one of three New Deal-era buildings in the Gila National Forest.
 Black Mountain Lookout Cabin
 Catwalk National Recreation Trail - A remnant of a water system for the former mining town of Graham, as many as 29,000 visitors a year walk on the Catwalk's trail or picnic at the mouth of the canyon.
 Cooney's Tomb - Located on the outskirts of Alma and near the ghost town of Cooney, Cooney's Tomb is a large boulder beside the road. It marks the burial location of James C. Cooney, a miner in the area who was killed by Apaches in 1880.
 El Caso Lake
 El Caso Lookout Complex - Built in 1934 by the Works Progress Administration, the complex was one of three New Deal-era forest fire lookouts built in Catron County.
 Gila Cliff Dwellings National Monument
Gila Wilderness
Glenwood State Trout Hatchery
 Mangas Mountain Lookout Complex
 Mogollon Historic District - The site of many historic buildings, Mogollon was a successful mining town until the turn of the 20th century.
 Mogollon Baldy Lookout Cabin
 Mogollon Pueblo
The Lightning Fields -  A 640-acre art installation by Walter De Maria.  Commissioned and maintained by Dia Art Foundation
 Tularosa River Site and Tularosa Ranger Station - A collection of more than 500 petroglyphs and a historic US Forest Service ranger station dating to the 1920s.
 Whitewater Canyon National Forest Recreation Area
 Zuni Salt Lake and Sanctuary - The Pueblo people of the Southwest have made annual pilgrimages to Zuñi Salt Lake to harvest salt, for both culinary and ceremonial purposes for thousands of years. Ancient roadways radiate out from the lake to the various pueblos and ancient pueblo sites.

Politics

Communities

Village
 Reserve (county seat)

Census-designated places

 Alma 
 Apache Creek 
 Aragon 
 Cruzville 
 Datil
 Escudilla Bonita
 Glenwood 
 Homestead
 Lower Frisco
 Luna 
 Middle Frisco
 Mogollon
 Pie Town 
 Pleasanton 
 Quemado 
 Rancho Grande
 Rivers

Unincorporated communities
 Old Horse Springs
 San Francisco Plaza

Education
School districts include:
 Quemado Independent Schools
 Reserve Independent Schools

Notable people
 Elfego Baca
 Agnes Morley Cleaveland
 Jerry D. Thompson, historian of the American Southwest, American Civil War, and Texas, was reared in Quemado in Catron County.
 Beverly Magennis, tile artist, author

See also
 National Register of Historic Places listings in Catron County, New Mexico

References

 
1921 establishments in New Mexico
Populated places established in 1921